Omar Alejandro Esparza Morales (born 21 May 1988) is a Mexican former professional footballer who played as a right-back. He is the brother of the professional football player, Rigoberto Esparza.

Club career
Esparza made his debut on October 15, 2005, against CF Monterrey, playing only 12 minutes. He had switched playing time between Chivas and CD Tapatio since then, with a brief stay in Chivas Coras in the 2004–2006 season.

He took part in Chivas's Championship win in the Apertura 2006.

Esparza was given high praise by Mexico coach Javier Aguirre for his performances and was expected to cement a place in the 2010 World Cup starting line-up. However a knee injury picked up in the final game of the season ended his world cup hopes and he is not expected to be back in full training until June 2010.

International career
Omar Esparza has played with the Mexico national football team in three categories.

He was present with the Mexico U-17 Team, in which he and his teammates won the U-17 World Cup in Peru in 2005. He played in the 2005 FIFA U-17 World Championship Match where Mexico obtained the cup against Brazil. The score was 3–0, and Esparza scored the 2nd goal of the final.

He has also played with U-20 in the FIFA U-20 World Cup that was held in Canada where he was an important player. Mexico played well but was eliminated by Argentina in the quarter finals, losing 1-0 thanks to a goal scored by Maximiliano Moralez after bouncing the ball off a Mexican defender in the 45th minute .

On August 22, 2007, Esparza made his first appearance for the senior side.

International Caps 
As of 16 April 2008

Honours
Guadalajara
Mexican Championship: Apertura 2006
InterLiga: 2009

Pachuca
Liga MX: Clausura 2016

Mexico U17
FIFA U-17 World Championship: 2005

References

External links
 

1988 births
Living people
Footballers from Jalisco
Association football fullbacks
Mexico international footballers
Mexico under-20 international footballers
Mexico youth international footballers
C.D. Guadalajara footballers
San Luis F.C. players
C.F. Pachuca players
Tampico Madero F.C. footballers
Liga MX players
Mexican footballers